Castallack is a hamlet in the civil parish of St Buryan, Lamorna and Paul in west Cornwall, England, UK. It is on a minor road between Sheffied and Lamorna.

Castallack lies within the Cornwall Area of Outstanding Natural Beauty (AONB). Almost a third of Cornwall has AONB designation, with the same status and protection as a National Park.

Castallack Roundago is a good example of a Romano-British round despite it having been partly destroyed in the 19th-century.

Granite from the Castallack quarries was used mainly for gravestones, activity finished in the mid-1980s.

References

External links

 

Hamlets in Cornwall
Penwith
Quarries in Cornwall